A Keps nut, (also called a k-lock nut or washer nut), is a nut with an attached, free-spinning washer. 

It is used to make assembly more convenient. Common washer types are star-type lock washers, conical, and flat washers.

'Keps' trademark
Keps is a trademark of ITW Shakeproof. The name comes from "kep" in ShaKEProof, and the "s" is because usually more than one are purchased.

References

Notes

Bibliography
.

Nuts (hardware)